ʻAbd al-Jabbār (ALA-LC romanization of ) is a Muslim male given name, and in modern usage, surname. It is built from the Arabic words ʻabd and al-Jabbār, one of the names of God in the Qur'an, which give rise to the Muslim theophoric names. It means "servant of the All-compeller".

It may refer to:

People

People of faith
Abd al-Jabbar ibn Ahmad (935–1025), Iraqi Qadi and religious author
Abdel-Sattar Abdel-Jabbar, Iraqi cleric
Abduljabbar Nasuru Kabara, Nigerian Islamic cleric
Nasuru Kabara (1924 - 1996) Nigerian Islamic cleric and formal Qadiriyya leader of West Africa.

Activists
Abdul Jabbar (activist) (1919–1952), Bengali-language demonstrator
Abdulwahid AlAbduljabbar (1935–1970), Saudi political prisoner

Politicians
Abdul Jalilul Jabbar, 17th-century sultan of Brunei
Khan Abdul Jabbar Khan (1882–1958), Pakistani politician
Abdul Jabbar Khan (1902–1984), Pakistani politician
M. A. Jabbar (1932–2020), Bangladeshi politician
Abdul Jabbar (Moulvibazar politician) (1945–1992), Bangladeshi politician
Abdul Jabbar Taqwa (born 1954), Afghan politician
Abdul Jabbar Naeemi (b. 1967), Afghan politician
Abdul Jabar Sabet, Afghan politician
Al-Haj Mamur Abdul Jabar Shulgari, Afghan politician

Scientists
Abdul Jabbar Hassoon Jerri, known as Abdul Jerri (born 1932), Iraqi American physicist and mathematician

Sportspeople
Abdul Jabbar (Bengal cricketer) (born 1919), Indian cricketer
Kareem Abdul-Jabbar (b. 1947), American basketball player
Abdul Jabbar (Tamil Nadu cricketer) (1952), Indian Tamil Nadu cricketer
Abdul-Jabar Hashim Hanoon (1970), Iraqi footballer who played defender
Karim Abdul-Jabbar, a previous name of Abdul-Karim al-Jabbar (1974), American footballer
Haidar Abdul-Jabar (1976), Iraqi footballer who plays defender
Ahmad Abdul-Jabar (1978), Iraqi footballer who plays midfielder
Abdul Jabbar (Canadian cricketer) (1983), Pakistani-Canadian cricketer
Abdul Jabbar (Kalat cricketer), Pakistani Kalat cricketer

Entertainers
Abdul Jabbar (singer) (1938-2017), Bangladeshi singer

Other
Abdul Jabar (Qala-i-Jangi captive) (born 1975), Afghan Qala-i-Jangi captive
Abdul Jabbar al-Oqaidi, Syrian soldier

References

Arabic masculine given names